A historically African-American municipality, known in various areas as "freedmen's town", "freedom towns", or "all-Black towns", are municipalities which were established by or for a predominantly African-American populace. Many of these municipalities were established or populated by freed slaves either during or after the period of legal slavery in the United States in the 19th century.

In Oklahoma before the end of segregation there existed dozens of these communities as many African-American migrants from the Southeast found a space whereby they could establish municipalities on their own terms. Chief among them was Edward P. McCabe, who envisioned so large a number of African-Americans settling in the territory that it would become a Black-governed state.  In Texas, 357 such "freedom colonies" have been located and verified.

List
Places marked in italics are no longer populated.

Alabama
 Africatown
 Hobson City

Arizona
 Mobile
 Randolph

California
 Allensworth

Canada
 North Buxton, Ontario

Colorado
 Dearfield

Florida
 Bradenton, Florida
 Eatonville
 Fort Mose
 Freedtown, Florida
 Rosewood

Georgia
 Chubbtown, Georgia
 Pin Point, Georgia
 Pennick, Georgia

Illinois
 Brooklyn
 Lakeview 
 New Philadelphia
 Robbins, Illinois

Indiana
 Beech Settlement
 Roberts Settlement
 Lyles Station, Indiana

Kansas
 Nicodemus

Kentucky
 Huntertown

Louisiana
 Mossville
 Scotlandville

Maine
 Harbor Island

Maryland
 Unionville

Massachusetts
 Parting Ways

Mississippi
 Davis Bend
 Mound Bayou

Missouri
 Kinloch
 Meacham Park
 North Webster
 Pennytown
 Robertson

Nebraska
 DeWitty

New Jersey
 Marshalltown
 Springtown
 Whitesboro
 [[Lawnside, New 
Jersey|Lawnside]]

New Mexico
 Blackdom
Vado

New York
Eastville, Sag Harbor, New York
Freetown, New York
 Sandy Ground
 Seneca Village
 Weeksville

North Carolina
 Bethania
 Hayti 
 James City
 Method, North Carolina, now part of Raleigh
 Princeville
 Roanoke Island Freedmen's Colony
 Oberlin Village, Raleigh, North Carolina

Oklahoma
 Boley
 Brooksville
 Clearview
 Grayson
 Langston
 Lima
 Redbird
 Rentie Grove, Tulsa
 Rentiesville
 Summit
 Taft
 Tatums
 Tullahassee
 Vernon
 Greenwood, Tulsa

South Carolina
 Mitchelville
 Promised Land

Tennessee
 Free Hill

Texas
 Barrett Station
 Douglass Community
 Deep Ellum, Dallas
 Ellis Alley, San Antonio
 Elm Thicket, Dallas
 Freedmen's Town Historic District, Fourth Ward, Houston
 Independence Heights, Houston
 Kendleton
 Little Egypt
 Moore Station
 Mosier Valley
 Pelham, Texas
 Peyton, Texas
 Quakertown| 
 Saint Johns Colony
 Shankleville
 Tamina
Tenth Street Historic District, Dallas

Virginia
Freedmen's Village, Arlington National Cemetery
 Pocahontas Island

Further reading

References

Freedmen's town, List of
American freedmen
African American-related lists